Stony Plain, originally named Stonyplain, was a provincial electoral district in Alberta, Canada, mandated to return a single member to the Legislative Assembly of Alberta from 1905 to 2019. The district returned a single member to the Legislative Assembly of Alberta throughout its history, using the first past the post method of voting for most of its existence but single transferable vote from 1926 to 1957.

The district was created in 1905 when Alberta became a province. The riding in its original boundaries stretched from the west Edmonton city limits to the British Columbia border, but over time it was significantly reduced in size. The riding was named Stonyplain from 1905 to 1909 before being changed to Stony Plain.

History
Stony Plain was founded as Stonyplain, one of the original 25 electoral districts contested in the 1905 Alberta general election upon Alberta joining Confederation in September 1905. It was renamed Stony Plain for the 1909 Alberta general election, retaining this name until its abolition. The original boundaries of the riding took it to the British Columbia from west Edmonton city limits, but over the next hundred years the riding was significantly decreased in area to a small fraction of its former size.

The 2010 electoral boundary re-distribution saw the riding transfer land north of Alberta Highway 16 to the electoral district of Whitecourt-Ste. Anne. In the 2017 re-distribution, the riding was abolished, with the town of Stony Plain moved to Spruce Grove-Stony Plain and the rural areas transferred to Lac Ste. Anne-Parkland and Drayton Valley-Devon. The area continued to be represented in the Legislative Assembly until the 2019 election, when new riding borders took effect.

Boundary history

Electoral history
The electoral district of Stony Plain was created when the province was first formed in 1905. It was one of the longest-surviving original districts, remaining intact for every boundary redistribution until 2017.

The first election in 1905 saw a three-way battle which was handily won by Liberal candidate John McPherson, who was reelected in 1909. He was defeated by Conservative party candidate Conrad Weidenhammer in 1913, who chose to retire after a single term. Conservative Frederick Lundy won the tight 1917 race to hold the district. He ran again in the 1921 election, but was defeated by United Farmers candidate Willard Washburn in a landslide. Washburn held the district for two terms before retiring in 1930. The United Farmers ran candidate Donald Macleod who held the district in a tight race over Liberal candidate George Bryan.

Macleod was defeated in 1935, finishing a very distant third place to Social Credit candidate William Hayes. The seat became vacant when Hayes died on April 2, 1939, and it would not be filled before the 1940 election. Cornelia Wood was nominated to be the Social Credit candidate, she won the district for her party in a tight race that went to ballot transfers. Wood was re-elected for three terms before being defeated by Liberal candidate John McLaughlin in 1955. McLaughlin would be defeated by Wood again in 1959. The two ran against each other twice more, with Wood coming up the winner each time.

Wood lost her nomination race to run as the Social Credit candidate again in the 1967 general election to Ralph Jespersen. She later left the Social Credit caucus on April 24, 1967 to run as an Independent Social Credit candidate. She would be defeated finishing a distant fourth place in a landslide by Jespersen.

Jespersen would only last a single term in office before being defeated by William Purdy in the 1971 general election. Purdy was re-elected three more times before retiring at dissolution in 1986. His replacement in the legislature was Progressive Conservative candidate Jim Heron. Heron served a term in office before being defeated by New Democrat Stan Woloshyn.

Woloshyn only stayed with the NDP caucus for a few years before crossing the floor to the Progressive Conservative caucus on February 23, 1993. He ran for re-election as a Progressive Conservative that year and won. In 1996 Premier Ralph Klein appointed him to the provincial cabinet. He won re-election again in 1997 and 2001 before retiring in 2004.

Fred Lindsay replaced Woloshyn in 2004 as the Progressive Conservative MLA for the riding and was re-elected in 2008. Former mayor Ken Lemke retained the riding for the PCs in the 2012 election. The last person to represent Stony Plain was Erin Babcock, who won the riding for the Alberta New Democratic Party in the 2015 election. At the 2019 election, the first after the riding was abolished, Babcock ran for reelection in the new Spruce Grove-Stony Plain riding, but lost to Searle Turton from the United Conservative Party. Lac Ste. Anne-Parkland and Drayton Valley-Devon, the other ridings to take in parts of the former Stony Plain riding, were also won by United Conservatives.

Election results

1905 general election

1909 general election

1913 general election

1917 general election

1921 general election

1926 general election

1930 general election

1935 general election

1940 general election

1944 general election

1948 general election

1952 general election

1955 general election

1959 general election

1963 general election

1967 general election

1971 general election

1975 general election

1979 general election

1982 general election

1986 general election

1989 general election

1993 general election

1997 general election

2001 general election

2004 general election

2008 general election

2012 general election

2015 general election

Senate nominee results

2004 Senate nominee election district results
Voters had the option of selecting 4 candidates on the ballot.

2012 Senate nominee election district results

Plebiscite results

1948 electrification plebiscite
District results from the first province wide plebiscite on electricity regulation:

1957 liquor plebiscite

On October 30, 1957 a stand-alone plebiscite was held province wide in all 50 of the then current provincial electoral districts in Alberta. The government decided to consult Alberta voters to decide on liquor sales and mixed drinking after a divisive debate in the legislature. The plebiscite was intended to deal with the growing demand for reforming antiquated liquor control laws.

The plebiscite was conducted in two parts. Question A, asked in all districts, asked the voters if the sale of liquor should be expanded in Alberta, while Question B, asked in a handful of districts within the corporate limits of Calgary and Edmonton, asked if men and women should be allowed to drink together in establishments.

Province wide Question A of the plebiscite passed in 33 of the 50 districts while Question B passed in all five districts. Stony Plain voted in favour of the proposal by a landslide majority. Voter turnout in the district was well under the province wide average of 46%.

Official district returns were released to the public on December 31, 1957. The Social Credit government in power at the time did not consider the results binding. However the results of the vote led the government to repeal all existing liquor legislation and introduce an entirely new Liquor Act.

Municipal districts lying inside electoral districts that voted against the plebiscite were designated Local Option Zones by the Alberta Liquor Control Board and considered effective dry zones. Business owners who wanted a license had to petition for a binding municipal plebiscite in order to be granted a license.

Student vote results

2004 student vote

On November 19, 2004 a student vote was conducted at participating Alberta schools to parallel the 2004 Alberta general election results. The vote was designed to educate students and simulate the electoral process for persons who have not yet reached the legal majority. The vote was conducted in 80 of the 83 provincial electoral districts with students voting for actual election candidates. Schools with a large student body who resided in another electoral district had the option to vote for candidates outside of the electoral district then where they were physically located.

2012 student vote

2015  student vote

See also
List of Alberta provincial electoral districts
Stony Plain, Alberta, a town in central Alberta

References

Further reading

External links 
Electoral Divisions Act 2003
Demographics for Stony Plain
Riding Map for Stony Plain
Student Vote Alberta 2004
Website of the Legislative Assembly of Alberta
Elections Alberta

Former provincial electoral districts of Alberta